Alucita trachyptera is a moth of the family Alucitidae. It is found in southern India and Sri Lanka.

References

Moths described in 1906
Alucitidae
Moths of Asia
Moths of Sri Lanka
Taxa named by Edward Meyrick